Thirteen is the first solo album by C. J. of The Wildhearts, released under the name CJ & The Satellites.

Track listing

Credits

 C. J. - vocals, lead guitar, keyboards, percussion, programming
 Paul Grant - guitar, vocals
 Lee Wray - bass
 John Solomon - drums
 Jason Edwards - producer, extra vocals, keyboards, percussion, programming

2007 albums